Zalan is a rural locality (an ulus) in Selenginsky District, Republic of Buryatia, Russia. The population was 74 as of 2010. There are 2 streets.

Geography 
Zalan is located 54 km southeast of Gusinoozyorsk (the district's administrative centre) by road. Zurgan-Debe is the nearest rural locality.

References 

Rural localities in Selenginsky District